“How Much Love” is a song by an American rock band Survivor. It was the opening track and the second single released from their 1986 album When Seconds Count.

The B-side of the single, "Backstreet Love Affair", also featured on the When Seconds Count album as the eighth track.

The single peaked at #51 on the Billboard Hot 100 on March 28, 1987 and remained on that chart for a total of 9 weeks.

References
 

1986 songs
1987 singles
Scotti Brothers Records singles
Songs written by Frankie Sullivan
Songs written by Jim Peterik
Survivor (band) songs